SCSD may refer to:
 Sacramento County Sheriff's Department
 Salton Community Services District, covering Desert Shores, California and Salton City, California
 SCSD (School Construction Systems Development ) project
 Shannon County School District (now Oglala Lakota County School District)
 Simpson County School District
 Smithtown Central School District
 Socorro Consolidated School District
 Southern California School for the Deaf
 Sunflower County School District
 Syosset Central School District
 Syracuse City School District